SHARC International Systems Inc. (CSE: SHRC), DBA SHARC Energy Systems, is a Canadian company, based in Vancouver, British Columbia, that specializes in wastewater heat recovery. Founded in 2010 by Lynn Mueller, the company operates throughout North America. A subsidiary, SHARC Energy Systems, based in Leicester, UK, operates throughout Europe.

The company is one of only a few worldwide focusing on waste heat recovery as an alternative energy source, reducing the need to burn fossil fuels. Their systems can be used for domestic hot water production as well as building space heating & cooling.

SHARC Energy's main products are the SHARC and PIRANHA, which remove solids from wastewater, allowing the wastewater to effectively move through a heat exchanger and heat pump. The systems provide hot water heating, space heating, air conditioning, and wastewater cooling.

See also
 Waste heat
 Energy recovery
 HVAC
 Wastewater

References

External links
 

Renewable energy technology